The Most Illustrious Halimi Family Order of Kedah (Bahasa Melayu: Darjah Kerabat Halimi Yang Amat Mulia Kedah) is an honorific order of the Sultanate of Kedah

History 
It was founded by Sultan 'Abdu'l Halim Mu'azzam Shah of Kedah in January 1973.

Award conditions 
The Darjah Kerabat Halimi is conferred at the express wish of the Sultan and is reserved for members of the Royal Family only. 

 Classes 
It is awarded in one class: 
  Darjah Kerabat Halimi or member - DKH

 Insignia 
The men's insignia consist of a sash, a neck chain and a star (Photo).
The women's insignia consist of a chest knot, a neck chain and a star (Photo).

 Notable recipients 

Sultan Abdul Halim of Kedah: 
  Founding Grand Master and Member of the Halimi Family Order of Kedah (DKH, since January 1973)

Members of the Royal Family of Kedah : 
  Member of the Halimi Family Order of Kedah :
 late Tuanku Bahiyah DMN SMN DK DKH SPMK (1st wife of the Sultan Abdul Halim) (DKH, 1.1976)  
 Sultanah Haminah of Kedah DMN DK DKH (current wife of the Sultan) (DKH, 16.7.2008)  
 Princess Intan Safinaz PSM DKH SSDK SHMS JP PAT (Sultan Abdul Halim of Kedah and Tuanku Bahiyah's daughter and Mbr of the Regency Council 2011) (DKH, 16.7.2008) 
 Tunku Abdul Malik, Raja Muda DK DKH DMK SPMK PSB (1st younger brother of the Sultan and heir prince of Kedah) (DKH, 22.2.1976)  
 Tunku Annuar, Tunku Bendahara'' PSM DKH DMK SPMK SSDK PSB (2nd ygr br. of the Sultan and head of the Regency Council 2011) (DKH, 16.7.2008)

Lists of recipients 
 List of honours of the Kedah Royal Family by country
 List of Honours of Kedah awarded to Heads of State and Royals
 Category: Members of the Halimi Family Order of Kedah

References 

Orders, decorations, and medals of Kedah